Events in the year 1899 in Portugal.

Incumbents
Monarch: Carlos I 
President of the Council of Ministers: José Luciano de Castro

Events
26 November - Legislative election

Architecture
Construction of St Andrew's Church in Lisbon.

Culture
"Serrana" (opera) by Alfredo Keil

Births
6 February - Jaime Gonçalves, footballer (deceased)
25 February - António Pinho, footballer (deceased)
21 April - José Ramos, footballer (deceased)
30 April - Fernando António, footballer (deceased)
10 May - Artur Paredes, guitar player (died 1980)
21 August - António Leite, fencer (died 1958)
26 August - Francisco Vieira, footballer (deceased)
24 October - João Francisco Maia, footballer (deceased)
8 November - Manuel António Vassalo e Silva, Governor-General of Portuguese India (died 1985)
19 December - Fernando Santos Costa, army officer (died 1982)
30 December - José Pimenta, footballer (deceased)
Armando Machado, fadista, guitarist, "viola" player (died 1974)
Jesus Muñoz Crespo, footballer (died 1979)
Sarmento Rodrigues, naval officer, colonist, professor (died 1979)

Deaths

3 March - José Simões Dias,  poet, short-story writer, literary critic, politician, pedagogue (born 1844).
José António Duro, poet (born 1875)

References

 
Portugal
Years of the 19th century in Portugal
Portugal